Kodersdorf is a municipality in the district Görlitz, Saxony, Germany. It is known by the motorway junction with the German motorway A 4.

References 

Municipalities in Saxony
Populated places in Görlitz (district)